Jeff Carl Greenlaw (born February 28, 1968) is a former Canadian ice hockey player. He played 57 games in the National Hockey League with the Washington Capitals and Florida Panthers between 1986 and 1994. Greenlaw was born in Aylmer, Ontario.

Playing career
A former member of the Canadian National Team, Greenlaw was selected by the Washington Capitals in the 1986 NHL Entry Draft, but spent most of his time in the minors. In 1993, Greenlaw signed as a free agent with the expansion Florida Panthers, but again spent most of his time in the minors with the Cincinnati Cyclones.

After several years with the Cyclones, he signed with the Austin Ice Bats of the Central Hockey League, where upon his retirement from active play he would become head coach of the team for a time.

Career statistics

Regular season and playoffs

International

External links

1968 births
Living people
Austin Ice Bats players
Austin Ice Bats (WPHL) players
Baltimore Skipjacks players
Binghamton Whalers players
Canadian ice hockey coaches
Canadian ice hockey left wingers
Cincinnati Cyclones (IHL) players
Florida Panthers players
National Hockey League first-round draft picks
People from Elgin County
Washington Capitals draft picks
Washington Capitals players